The Permanent Electoral Authority is the Romanian agency that manages the electoral infrastructure between the elections. During the elections, the authority is the Central Electoral Bureau, specially constituted for each election.

References

Electoral Authority